Street poster art is a kind of graffiti, more specifically categorized as "street art". Posters are usually handmade or printed graphics on thin paper. It can be understood as an art piece that is installed on the streets as opposed to in a gallery or museum, but by some it is not comprehended as a form of contemporary art.

Gallery

See also

 Graffiti terminology
 List of street artists
 Street art sculptures
 Stencil street art
 Street art
 Street installation

References

Further reading
 E Pluribus Venom by Shepard Fairey (2008) Gingko Press.
 Philosophy of Obey (Obey Giant): The Formative Years (1989 - 2008), edited by Sarah Jaye Williams (2008), Nerve Books UK.
 Obey: Supply & Demand, The Art of Shepard Fairey by Shepard Fairey (2006), Gingko Press.
 Popaganda: The Art and Crimes of Ron English by Ron English(2004) Last Gasp
 RE/Search: Pranks 2 by V Vale(2006) RE/Search Publications

Visual arts genres
Posters